Blaine is a historic community located in Anderson County, South Carolina.

Sources
 Von Hasseln, J.H. Map of Anderson County, South Carolina. Anderson, South Carolina, 1897.
 Blaine, South Carolina. Geographic Names Information System, U.S. Geological Survey.

Former populated places in South Carolina
Populated places in Anderson County, South Carolina